Harri Henrik Eloranta (born 4 December 1963 in Köyliö) is a Finnish former biathlete, who won the bronze medal in the 10 km sprint at the 1992 Olympics in Albertville, France.

References

External links
 
 

1963 births
Living people
People from Köyliö
Finnish male biathletes
Biathletes at the 1988 Winter Olympics
Biathletes at the 1992 Winter Olympics
Biathletes at the 1994 Winter Olympics
Biathletes at the 1998 Winter Olympics
Olympic biathletes of Finland
Olympic bronze medalists for Finland
Olympic medalists in biathlon
Medalists at the 1992 Winter Olympics
Sportspeople from Satakunta
20th-century Finnish people